Paul McGrath (April 11, 1904 – April 13, 1978) was an American film, television, Broadway, and Pittsburgh actor best known for his radio appearances in the 1940s and 1950s.

Early years 
Born in Chicago, McGrath was educated in public schools in New York, including Evander Childs High School. He attended Carnegie Tech and studied engineering before developing an interest in drama. He left in 1924 to become an actor.

Career 
McGrath's professional debut came as a member of a touring company of The First Year. 

On radio, McGrath was a regular on Crime Doctor and on the soap operas Big Sister and Young Doctor Malone. He  played the host on Inner Sanctum Mystery on radio and on a syndicated TV version of the program. His other work on television included appearances on the dramas Armstrong Circle Theatre, Hallmark Hall of Fame, and The United States Steel Hour. He also was featured on TV serials, including The Edge of Night, Love of Life, Guiding Light, and The Secret Storm.

On Broadway, McGrath appeared in more than 30 plays, including the 1949 Clifford Odets Broadway play The Big Knife. His Broadway debut was as Dr. Green in In the Near Future (1925), and his last Broadway role was Nick Hagen in Brightower (1970).

Personal life and death
McGrath was married to actress Anne Sargent. He died of a heart attack in his sleep in London on April 13, 1978, two days after his 74th birthday.

Filmography

References

External links 

1904 births
1978 deaths
20th-century American male actors
20th-century American singers
American male film actors
American male television actors
American male stage actors
American male radio actors
Male actors from Pittsburgh
Male actors from Chicago
Carnegie Mellon University alumni